Radioaktiva räker was a Swedish trallpunk band, formed in Hofors in 1991. The first line up was Johan Anttila, Daniel Torro, Jonas Lund and Mattias Johansson. In the summer of 1992 they were signed to the record label Beat Butchers. During the 1990s Radiaktive räker was one of the biggest punk bands in Sweden. Daniel Torro was later replaced by Jimmy Petterson. Radioaktiva räker split up 2003 after releasing an album called Finito and playing a summer tour.

The band reunited on September 25, 2009, for an evening with the celebration of the Beat Butchers 25 year anniversary. This occurred on Södra Teatern in Stockholm together with a number of other punk bands that have collaborated with Beat Butchers.

Members
 Johan Anttila - vocals, guitar
 Jimmy Petersson - guitar, vocals
 Mattias "Dåglas" Johansson - bass guitar
 Jonas Lund - drums

Former members
 Daniel Torro - vocals, guitar
 Jimmy Lindqvist - bass guitar

Discography
Verkligheten (1993)
Bakom spegeln (1994)
Labyrint (1994)
....Res dig upp (1996)
Döda mej inte så dödar jag inte dej (1998)

Compilation albums
Tro inte allt (1998)
Finito (2003)

References

External links
 http://www.radioaktivaraker.com/

Swedish punk rock groups